Georgeta Snegur (23 April 1937 – 23 December 2019) was the First Lady of Moldova from 1990 to 1997 as the wife of President Mircea Snegur.

Personal life and death
In 1960, she married Mircea Snegur (born 17 January 1940) and had a daughter, Natalia Gherman, and a son. She died on 23 December 2019 at the age of 82. She was buried on 25 December at the Central Cemetery of Chisinau.

References

1937 births
2019 deaths
First ladies and gentlemen of Moldova